William King Hannah (6 August 1921 – 1978) was a Scottish professional footballer who made 26 Scottish League appearances for Albion Rovers and 121 appearances in the English Football League playing as an inside forward for Preston North End and Barrow.

Hannah was born in Shotts, Lanarkshire, in 1921 and died in Preston, Lancashire, in 1978.

Notes

References

1921 births
1978 deaths
Sportspeople from Shotts
Scottish footballers
Association football inside forwards
Albion Rovers F.C. players
Preston North End F.C. players
Barrow A.F.C. players
Scottish Football League players
English Football League players
Footballers from North Lanarkshire